The 1998 Oakland Raiders season was their 39th in the league. They improved upon their previous season's output of 4–12, winning eight games. This was the team's fifth consecutive season in which they failed to qualify for the playoffs.

The season saw the Raiders draft Heisman Trophy winner Charles Woodson. He made an immediate impact and was named to the Pro Bowl following the season.

Offseason

NFL draft

Staff

Roster

Schedule

Standings

References 

Oakland Raiders seasons
Oakland Raiders
Oakland